Schkuhria is a genus of flowering plants in the tribe Bahieae within the family Asteraceae. False threadleaf is a common name. The genus was named in honour of Christian Schkuhr (1741-1811), a German gardener and physical scientist at the University of Wittenberg.

 Species
 Schkuhria degenerica (Kuntze) R.E.Fr. - Bolivia, Jujuy, Salta
 Schkuhria guatemalensis (Rydb.) Standl. & Steyerm.
 Schkuhria multiflora Hook. & Arn. - Argentina, Uruguay, Chile, Peru, Chihuahua, United States (CA AZ NM TX CO MI)
 Schkuhria pinnata (Lam.) Kuntze ex Thell. - South America, Mesoamerica, United States (AZ NM TX MD) South Africa
 Schkuhria schkuhrioides (Link & Otto) Thell. - Mexico (Michoacán, Nayarit, Jalisco, México State, D.F., Durango, Aguascalientes)
 Schkuhria senecioides Nees - Mexico
 Schkuhria virgata (La Llave) DC.

 formerly included
Several species now regarded as members of other genera: Achyropappus Florestina Hymenothrix Platyschkuhria Picradeniopsis

References

External links
 USDA: Schkuhria

Bahieae
Asteraceae genera